The Jumeirah Islands are a housing development in Dubai, United Arab Emirates, developed by Nakheel Properties, a Dubai-based property development company. They lie inland from Dubai Marina and Jumeirah Lake Towers, east of the main spinal highway, Sheikh Zayed Road (E11), between interchanges 5 and 6. Jumeirah Islands consist of small islands (called clusters), each containing sixteen residential villas; buildings are of varied designs, from Islamic to Mediterranean architecture. The islands sit in an artificial lake filled with seawater. The whole complex has a land-to-water ratio of 23:77. The complex includes fifty islands (forty-six of which are the residential clusters), a restaurant, a supermarket, a club house, a gym, beauty salons, a pharmacy and a leisure facility. Each of the 736 houses has its own swimming pool. The project was completed at the end of 2006. Nearby properties include the Jumeirah Lake Towers and Palm Jumeirah, both built by Nakheel Properties.

References

2004 establishments in the United Arab Emirates
Buildings and structures in Dubai
Artificial islands of Dubai
Artificial lakes
Nakheel Properties